Hasib Qoway Markaz (Persian. حسیب قوای مرکز ,born on January 28, 1992) (Abdara Panjshir village) is a military commander from Afghanistan. Markaz is one of the senior commanders of the National Resistance Front of Afghanistan. He is one of the key commanders under the command of Ahmad Massoud and is one of the prominent anti-Taliban figures. who is now in charge of the special forces of the National Resistance Front of Afghanistan in Panjshir province.

Biography 
Hasib Qoway Markaz or (Hasib Panjshiri) was born on January 28, 1992, in Abdara village of Panjshir province.  In 2014, after completing the higher military education, he entered the special units of the (National Directorate of security) of Afghanistan. After significant successes in various operations of this institution in different parts of Afghanistan, he achieved important positions in this institution. But in 2018, After eight years he stopped working with this organization. Later in 2019, he broadcast a video tape and claimed that the National Directorate of security(NDS) of Afghanistan asked him to assassinate six of the country's elites, but he refused. After these statements, the National Security Directorate of Afghanistan issued a warrant for his arrest. In a statement, the Ministry of Interior accused Hasib of the central forces of three murders. and stated that he will be arrested soon. On March 24, 2019, special forces of National Directorate of security (NDS) and the Ministry of Interior of Afghanistan(MOA) went to Panjshir province to arrest him. After several hours of fighting, the Afghan Ministry of Interior announced that the operation to capture Hasib by the central forces had failed. After the fall of the Republic of Afghanistan on August 15, 2021, the central forces with the forces under his command, led by Ahmad Masoud, prepared for armed defense against the Taliban. With frequent Taliban attacks on Punjsher Valley and bloody conflicts in this province, he was able to inflict heavy casualties on the Taliban, but due to the lack of ammunition, lack of sufficient forces and the breaking of the battle lines by Taliban infiltrators, the central forces with the forces under his command had to They retreated.

See also 
Ahmad Massoud
Ajmal selab
National resistance front

References 

1992 births
Living people
Politicians of Panjshir Province
Vice presidents of Afghanistan
Interior ministers of Afghanistan
People of the Islamic Republic of Afghanistan
Afghan politicians
Afghan Tajik people
Afghan expatriates in Tajikistan
Spymasters
Directors of intelligence agencies